Costentalina is a genus of medium-sized tusk shells, marine scaphopod molluscs in the family Entalinidae.

Species
 Costentalina caymanica Chistikov, 1982
 Costentalina elegans Chistikov, 1982
 Costentalina indica Chistikov, 1982
 Costentalina leptoconcha Chistikov, 1982
 Costentalina pacifica Chistikov, 1982
 Costentalina tuscarorae Chistikov, 1982
 Costentalina vemae Scarabino, 1986

References

 Chistikov S. D. 1982. The modern Entalinidae (Scaphopoda, Gadilida), 1. Subfamily Heteroschismoidinae - 1 [in Russian]. Zoologicheskii Zhurnal 61 (5): 671-682
 Scarabino V., 1995 Scaphopoda of the tropical Pacific and Indian Oceans, with description of 3 new genera and 42 new species P. Bouchet (ed) Résultats des Campagnes MUSORSTOM, Volume 14 Mémoires du Muséum National d'Histoire Naturelle, 167 189-379

External links
 Steiner, G.; Kabat, A. R. (2001). Catalogue of supraspecific taxa of Scaphopoda (Mollusca). Zoosystema. 23(3): 433-460

Scaphopods
Mollusc genera